An All-Colored Vaudeville Show is an extant American film featuring vaudeville acts released in 1935. Acts include Adelaide Hall, the Nicholas Brothers and Eunice Wilson backed by the Five Racketeers. It was distributed by Warner Brothers. It was produced by Vitaphone. The 30-minute film was directed by Roy Mack. The film includes a performance by the Nicholas Brothers.

References

 Warner Bros. films
 Vaudeville
 Vitaphone short films
American short films
 1935 in the United States